Tarapaya River, originally also called Qayara, is a Bolivian river in the Potosí Department, Tomás Frías Province. Its direction is mainly north. Tarapaya is a right tributary of the upper Pillku Mayu.

See also 
 Jatun Mayu
 Jayaq Mayu

External links 
  W.H. Strosnider, R.W. Nairn, H. Ríos Montero, F. Llanos Pinto, Water quality impacts from in-stream mine tailings in Rio Tarapaya, Potosí, Bolivia, see map

References

Rivers of Potosí Department